Fire Island is a 2022 American romantic comedy film directed by Andrew Ahn, and written by and starring Joel Kim Booster. The film co-stars Bowen Yang, Conrad Ricamora, James Scully, and Margaret Cho. Inspired by Jane Austen's Pride and Prejudice, the story follows a group of gay friends who go on vacation to Fire Island, only for things to become complicated by classism and romance.

Distributed and produced by Searchlight Pictures, the film was released on Hulu on June 3, 2022. The film received generally positive reviews.

Plot
Every year, Noah and his close friends Howie, Luke, Keegan, and Max embark on a weeklong vacation to Fire Island, noted for its gay villages. The group takes the ferry from Sayville, New York on Long Island's South Shore to Fire Island Pines, and are reunited with their "house mother" Erin. Erin reveals that she has to sell her house, making this the last week they will spend together. The group meets Charlie, a doctor, and his wealthy friends, including Will, a lawyer, and Cooper. Howie and Charlie take interest in each other. Noah decides that his mission for the trip is for Howie to get laid. Charlie invites the group to his house, where the group gets drunk and causes a scene while Charlie and Howie get closer. Noah overhears Will criticizing the group's behavior.

The next day, Noah invites Charlie and his friends to dinner at Erin's. At the grocery store, Noah meets Dex and they flirt. After seeing that Will dislikes Dex, Noah invites Dex to dinner as well. Charlie, Cooper, and Will arrive for dinner, and Noah and Will discuss books, surprising Noah. Dex arrives, making Will uncomfortable. Dex claims that Will judges him for making content on OnlyFans.

Howie tells the group that he and Charlie kissed, making Noah more intent on making the two a match. The group attends the weekly underwear party in Cherry Grove and do an assortment of illicit drugs. Cooper implies to Noah that he wants Will for himself and accuses Noah's growing attraction to Will of being based on money.

Noah meets up with Dex again. They head to the dark room to have sex, but Noah is distracted by Will and accidentally hits Dex in the nose. This causes a public confrontation between Cooper, Will, Dex, and Noah, during which Noah sees Charlie making out with someone that is not Howie. Noah gathers his intoxicated friends and Howie, who is distraught about Charlie. Noah walks back to the Pines with Will and they fight. Noah accuses Will of being uptight and judgmental, and Will tells Noah that Noah is pretentious even if he pretends not to be. At an afterparty in the Pines, Howie and Noah fight. Howie wants to give up on searching for romance and tells Noah that their experiences are not the same just because they are both gay and Asian, citing issues of body dysmorphia.

Noah is woken up the next day by his friends delivering a letter from Will. Will apologizes for the impression he gave and explains that Dex hurt someone close to Will in the past. Charlie arrives to tell Howie that he has gotten back together with his ex-boyfriend, who has lyme disease, and will be leaving the island sooner than expected.

Noah runs into Will at a drag bar. He shows Noah Dex’s Instagram profile, on which he posts thirst traps with activism tags (“Black Lives Matter” and “Stop Asian Hate”) to get attention. Noah and Will grow closer. Later, the group learn that Dex has posted a video of him and Luke having sex online without Luke's consent. Will helps Noah confront Dex by threatening legal action. Dex agrees to take down the video.

The next day, Howie tells Noah he is leaving because he cannot get over Charlie's rejection. Noah confronts Charlie, who acknowledges that he has feelings for Howie. Noah and his friends hijack a water taxi to catch up to Howie's. Charlie express his feelings to Howie, and they kiss. The group goes to watch the sunset. Noah and Will dance together and finally kiss, agreeing to give their relationship a try.

Cast
 Joel Kim Booster as Noah, based on Elizabeth Bennet
 Bowen Yang as Howie, based on Jane Bennet and Charlotte Lucas
 Conrad Ricamora as Will, based on Fitzwilliam Darcy
 James Scully as Charlie, based on Charles Bingley
 Margaret Cho as Erin, based on Mr. Bennet
 Matt Rogers as Luke, based on Lydia Bennet
 Tomás Matos as Keegan, based on Kitty Bennet
 Torian Miller as Max, based on Mary Bennet
 Nick Adams as Cooper, based on both Caroline Bingley and Lady Catherine 
 Zane Phillips as Dex, based on George Wickham
 Michael Graceffa as Rhys
 Aidan Wharton as Braden
 Peter Smith as Moses, based on Mr Collins
 Bradley Gibson as Johnny

Production
Streaming television network Quibi announced development of a comedy series titled Trip in September 2019, starring, created, and written by Joel Kim Booster. The project was given a series order on March 11, 2020, with Jax Media set to produce. Bowen Yang was cast in a lead role on April 15, 2020. Booster and Yang, who are both out gay Asian comedians and "life-changing" friends, were set to play fictionalized versions of themselves. Closet Monster filmmaker Stephen Dunn was attached to direct the series. Upon the shutdown of Quibi on December 1, 2020, the entire project was jeopardized.

Searchlight Pictures announced the purchase of Booster's script on June 30, 2021, to produce as a feature film re-titled Fire Island. Spa Night director Andrew Ahn replaced Dunn as director. The following month, Margaret Cho joined the cast of the film, as the only woman to be part of the film's cast. Conrad Ricamora, James Scully, Matt Rogers, Tomas Matos, Torian Miller, and Nick Adams were added to the film in August 2021, with Zane Phillips, Michael Graceffa, Aidan Wharton, Peter Smith, and Bradley Gibson joining the ensemble cast. Principal photography began August 12, 2021, and was scheduled to last through September 2021, with filming taking place in Manhattan, Brooklyn, and Fire Island, the locale of the film's title. The final script incorporated humorous topics the filmmakers had long shared as friends.

Release
The film was released June 3, 2022, on Hulu in the United States, Star+ in Latin America, and later released on June 17 Disney+ via Star in other international territories.

Reception

Audience viewership 
According to Whip Media's viewership tracking app TV Time, Fire Island was the 8th most anticipated film, during the month of June 2022. According to the streaming aggregator Reelgood, Fire Island was the 6th most streamed movie across all platforms, during the week of June 11, 2022.

Critical reception 
 On Metacritic, the film has a weighted average score of 72 out of 100 based on reviews from 32 critics, indicating "generally favorable reviews."

Alex Abad-Santos of Vox applauded Fire Island  for being a high-profile comedy movie that dares to focus on gay men's sex lives without providing debauchery, and found the screenplay ambitious for its approach on social expectations, stereotypes, and racism. He also praised the film's take on friendship between LGBT people, while complimenting the chemistry between Joel Kim Booster and Bowen Yang's characters.

David Fear of Rolling Stone found Fire Island to be a love letter to the LGBT community and its culture, writing, "This romantic comedy has its share of those archetypes. It also has gay lead characters, gay love interests, gay heroes, gay villains, and gay people of color galore. That doesn’t excuse some of the clunkier, more brochure-friendly scenarios that Fire Island throws at them. But it does give you the warmest gratitude towards the persons who, by bringing everyone to this picture-perfect spot and inviting them to the party in the Pines, had been the means of uniting them."

Siddhant Adlakha of IGN rated the movie 9/10 and wrote: "Indie director Andrew Ahn creates a mainstream queer classic with the romcom Fire Island, his inventive modern adaptation of Pride and Prejudice. Following a group of gay friends on a wild vacation, it features some of the funniest and most tension-filled scenes in any movie this year. As complete as any piece of entertainment can be."

Jude Dry of IndieWire gave the film an "A-" rating. Dry found Booster's screenplay amusing and stated that Andrew Ahn's direction "brings a cinematic touch that elevates the comedy." Odie Henderson of RogerEbert.com rated the movie 3 out of 4 stars and called it an entertaining and heartfelt romantic comedy film. Henderson complimented Booster's screenplay for its humor and its approach on racial issues, and praised Ahn's approach to plot lines and characters conflicts. Henderson also singled out cinematographer Felipe Vara de Rey, saying he manages to provide a nostalgic feeling about the island of the same name.

Jennifer Green of Common Sense Media rated the film 3 out of 5 stars and complimented the movie for its depiction of positive messages and role models, as well as its diverse characters of different origins and sexualities. Green stated Fire Island manages to approach issues raised by heteronormativity and social expectations.

Accolades

See also

 Bros
 LGBT culture in New York
 List of LGBT people from New York
 Long Island
 Pose
 Spoiler Alert

References

External links
 

2022 LGBT-related films
2022 romantic comedy films
American LGBT-related films
American romantic comedy films
Comedy films about Asian Americans
Asian-American LGBT-related films
Films about friendship
Films about vacationing
2020s buddy comedy films
Films based on Pride and Prejudice
Films directed by Andrew Ahn
Films set in Long Island
Films shot in New York (state)
Films shot in New York City
Gay-related films
Hulu original films
LGBT-related romantic comedy films
Searchlight Pictures films
2022 independent films
Films impacted by the COVID-19 pandemic
2020s English-language films
2020s American films